Masumiyet (Innocence) is a 1997 Turkish dramatic film directed by Zeki Demirkubuz and starring Derya Alabora, Haluk Bilginer and Güven Kıraç. It was followed by a prequel Kader produced in 2006.

Cast 
 Derya Alabora as Uğur
 Haluk Bilginer as Bekir
 Güven Kıraç as Yusuf
 Melis Tuna

External links 
 
 Film page on Filmpot

1997 films
1990s Turkish-language films
1997 drama films
Golden Orange Avni Tolunay Jury Special Award winners
Best Picture Golden Boll Award winners
Films directed by Zeki Demirkubuz
Films set in İzmir
Turkish drama films
Films shot in İzmir